Mazopherusa is a genus of flabelligerid annelid worm, known only from the Pennsylvanian Mazon Creek Lagerstatte; it is the only bona fide fossil member of the family.

References

Terebellida